Marfa Girl 2 is a 2018 drama film written and directed by Larry Clark. A sequel to his 2012 film Marfa Girl, the film follows the characters of that film, set in the West Texas town of Marfa. The film has been noted for Clark‘s obsession with "raw sexuality" and unsimulated sex scenes.

Synopsis
A victim of sexual violence, a young mother from Marfa, Texas, tries to recover with the help of her family.

Cast 
 Adam Mediano as Adam
 Drake Burnette as Marfa Girl
 Mercedes Maxwell as Inez
 Jonathan Velasquez as Miguel
 Indigo Rael as Donna
 Jeremy St. James as Tom
 Mary Farley as Mary
 Lucas Elliot Eberl as Luke
 Edgar Morais as Zaden

References

External links 

 

2018 films
2010s English-language films
Films directed by Larry Clark
American sequel films
American erotic drama films
2010s erotic drama films
Marfa, Texas
2018 drama films
2010s American films